Charley and Mimmo is a traditionally animated children's television series that aired on YTV between 1999 and 2002.

Plot
Charley and Mimmo consists of a typical family (father, mother, son, and baby sister) in a suburban town. The son, Charley (and his subanthromorphic teddy bear Mimmo), are the main characters. Charley and his family and friends are penguin/seal-like creatures (with round orange clown-like noses instead of beaks, and they live in a warm area rather than Antarctica. They have penguin-like feet and coloring, but have mitten-like "hands" rather than wings or flippers). Charley and most of the characters are a standard black and white, typical of real penguins, although some of the other characters are brown.

A 2004 movie entitled "T'choupi" was released by Gebeka Films, but only in France and South Korea. The plot follows Charley and his friends working together to find out who has stolen all the toys. "T'choupi" is Charley's name in French and "Doudou" is Mimmo's name in French.

Series
Charley and Mimmo aired in 10–15 minute segments on YTV. The show seems somewhat related to another Canadian children's production Caillou, as it has a similar artstyle and plot (except Caillou has longer stories and live puppet segments in the PBS Kids airings).

It was first seen in the United States on It's Itsy Bitsy Time, among many foreign short segments when it was broadcast on Fox Family in the late-1990s. It was also shown on Treehouse TV.

The original music score for the series is the work of composer Peter Measroch.

Characters
-Charley (voiced by Samuel Holden): The star of the show. He is a typical, average child. His voice and appearance suggest that he is somewhere between four and seven years old, although he is smart for his age. Charley is occasionally bossy and frequently starts arguments among his friends. He also tends to get upset, angry and jealous quickly, and then regrets it later. Sometimes, Charley lies and has a slightly disapproving character.

-Lola (voiced by Sonja Ball) & Ted (voiced by Rick Jones): Charley and Franny's parents.

-Franny (voiced by Sonja Ball): Charley's baby sister. She mostly speaks gibberish.

-Lily (voiced by Sonja Ball): A girl who is Charley's friend. She has curly black pigtails. At the beach, she wears a yellow swimsuit. She has a female teddy bear who Charley won for her at a carnival, and with which Mimmo is falling in love.

-Grandpa (voiced by Walter Massey) & Grandma (voiced by Thelma Farmer): Charley's grandparents.

-Pauli (voiced by Alfee Kaufman): One of Charley's friends. He has reddish-brown and white fur, curly hair, and freckles.

-Paula (voiced by Susan Glover): Another friend of Charley. She has brown fur and blonde hair with bangs.

Kids

Titles in other languages
 Arabic:  ("Amjad and Mimmo")
 Brazilian Portuguese: Charley e Mimmo
 Greek: Τσάρλι και Μίμο
 Hebrew:  ("Charley and Dodo")
 Khmer:  doudou ning joupi
 Persian: 
 Spanish: Chupi Y Mimmo
 한국어: "추피와 친구들, 추피와 두두"

References

External links
 

1990s Belgian television series
2000s Belgian television series
1990s Canadian animated television series
2000s Canadian animated television series
1990s French animated television series
2000s French animated television series
1999 Belgian television series debuts
1999 Canadian television series debuts
1999 French television series debuts
2002 Belgian television series endings
2002 Canadian television series endings
2002 French television series endings
1990s preschool education television series
2000s preschool education television series
Animated duos
Belgian children's animated television series
Canadian children's animated television series
Canadian preschool education television series
Canadian television shows based on children's books
Fictional duos
French children's animated television series
French preschool education television series
French television shows based on children's books
Animated preschool education television series
Television shows adapted into films
English-language television shows
French-language television shows
YTV (Canadian TV channel) original programming
Treehouse TV original programming
Animated television series about penguins
Fictional teddy bears
Sentient toys in fiction
Animated television series about children
Animated television series about siblings
Animated television series about families
Works about friendship
Works about suburbs